Shubinka is a rural locality (a selo) and the administrative center of Shubinsky Selsoviet of Yegoryevsky District, Altai Krai, Russia. The population was 540 as of 2016. There are 6 streets.

Geography 
Shubinka is located 20 km south of Novoyegoryevskoye (the district's administrative centre) by road. Borisovka is the nearest rural locality.

References 

Rural localities in Yegoryevsky District, Altai Krai